The Chelford rail accident occurred on 22 December 1894 at Chelford railway station. The stationmaster was supervising shunting operations, during which a high-sided wagon was fly-shunted (i.e. run-off) into a siding in strong winds and rapidly fading light. As another six wagons were being run onto an adjoining road, the stationmaster saw the high-sided wagon being blown out of its siding by the wind to meet them. A collision occurred derailing the runaway in such a way that it fouled the main line just as the 16:15 Manchester to Crewe express approached, drawn by two locomotives, LNWR Waterloo Class 2-4-0 No 418 Zygia and Experiment Class No 518 Express.  The stationmaster ran towards them waving a red lamp but the drivers thought he was signalling to the shunters and did not slacken speed. Zygia derailed and fell on her side whilst her tender ran up the platform ramp. Express remained upright but the first carriage demolished the front of a signalbox. In all, 14 passengers were killed and 48 injured.

The inquiry had little comment to make as this seemed to be a freak accident but advised that, in future, the brakes of all shunted wagons should be immediately pinned down.

A contemporary photo supposedly shows the re-railed damaged locomotive Zygia shortly after the accident.

See also 

 List of wind-related railway accidents

References

Sources 
 
 

Railway accidents and incidents in Cheshire
Railway accidents in 1894
1894 in England
History of Cheshire
Accidents and incidents involving London and North Western Railway
Runaway train disasters
19th century in Cheshire
Derailments in England
December 1894 events
Train collisions in England
1894 disasters in the United Kingdom